Ünlükaya (formerly Narman and Kışlaköy) is a town in Erzurum Province, Turkey.

References

Erzurum
Towns in Turkey
Populated places in Erzurum Province